Kosgama Grama Niladhari Division is a Grama Niladhari Division of the Panvila Divisional Secretariat of Kandy District of Central Province, Sri Lanka. It has Grama Niladhari Division Code 739.

Kosgama is a surrounded by the Etanwala, Mahapathana, Thawalanthenna, Beddegama, Arattana, Madulkele and Watakele Grama Niladhari Divisions.

Demographics

Ethnicity 

The Kosgama Grama Niladhari Division has an Indian Tamil majority (57.4%), a significant Sinhalese population (23.1%) and a significant Moor population (11.8%). In comparison, the Panvila Divisional Secretariat (which contains the Kosgama Grama Niladhari Division) has an Indian Tamil plurality (49.5%) and a significant Sinhalese population (38.3%)

Religion 

The Kosgama Grama Niladhari Division has a Hindu majority (63.3%), a significant Buddhist population (23.4%) and a significant Muslim population (11.8%). In comparison, the Panvila Divisional Secretariat (which contains the Kosgama Grama Niladhari Division) has a Hindu majority (52.2%) and a significant Buddhist population (37.9%)

References 

Grama Niladhari Divisions of Panvila Divisional Secretariat